Carpe Diem is Nightmare's tenth full-length studio album. As with all of their recent album and single releases, it came in three different versions, each with different artwork. The two limited editions (Types A & B), each come with different DVD tracks while the standard edition (Type C) came with one extra song. The album peaked #7 in the Oricon charts.

Track listing

Limited Edition A

Limited Edition B

NOTES

Single Information
TABOO
Released: June 25, 2014
Oricon Chart Peak Position: #6

blur
Released: January 1, 2015
Oricon Chart Peak Position: #8

References

2015 albums
Nightmare (Japanese band) albums
Avex Group albums
Japanese-language albums